Nemakonde High School is a Government high school located in Chinhoyi, Mashonaland West province, Zimbabwe. The school is located in Chikonohono Township on the southern part of the town.

The school admitted its first pupils in 1979, offering only Form One classes. These pioneering pupils were the first group to write O levels exams in November 1982. The first headmaster was Mr Mukonoweshuro deputised by Mr Ngwenya. The school has enjoyed a long period of academic successes under the leadership of the now retired Michael Madare Shambare who was at the helm from 1991 to 2011.

Chinhoyi
High schools in Zimbabwe
Educational institutions established in 1979
1979 establishments in Rhodesia
Education in Mashonaland West Province

 It is now a well known school in Chinhoyi. The School is currently as of )2022) being headed by Mr Bernard Tavaguta who took over from Mr Shambare.